
Gmina Koniusza is a rural gmina (administrative district) in Proszowice County, Lesser Poland Voivodeship, in southern Poland.

Villages
Gmina Koniusza contains the villages and settlements of Biórków Mały, Biórków Wielki, Chorążyce, Czernichów, Dalewice, Glew, Glewiec, Gnatowice, Górka Jaklińska, Karwin, Koniusza, Łyszkowice, Muniaczkowice, Niegardów, Niegardów-Kolonia, Piotrkowice Małe, Piotrkowice Wielkie, Polekarcice, Posądza, Przesławice, Rzędowice, Siedliska, Szarbia, Wąsów, Wierzbno, Wroniec, Wronin and Zielona.

Neighbouring gminas
Gmina Koniusza is bordered by the gminas of Igołomia-Wawrzeńczyce, Kocmyrzów-Luborzyca, Proszowice, Radziemice and Słomniki.

References
Polish official population figures 2006

Koniusza
Proszowice County